Hanben Station is a railway station on the Taiwan Railways Administration North-link line located in Nan'ao Township, Yilan County, Taiwan.

History
The station was opened on 1 February 1980.

See also
 List of railway stations in Taiwan

References

1980 establishments in Taiwan
Railway stations in Yilan County, Taiwan
Railway stations opened in 1980
Railway stations served by Taiwan Railways Administration